Hyak was a sternwheel steamboat that operated in British Columbia on the Columbia River from 1892 to 1906.  Hyak should not be confused with the Puget Sound propeller-driven steamboat also named Hyak.  The name means "swift" or "fast" in the Chinook Jargon.

Design and construction
Hyak was built at Golden, BC in 1892 for the Upper Columbia Navig. & Tramway Co., of which Capt. Frank P. Armstrong was the principal owner and manager.

Operations
Hyak was operated on the upper Columbia route from Golden to Windermere Lake.  In 1903 Hyak was sold to the Columbia River Lumber Company, which hired Armstrong to manage its steamboat operations.<ref name = McCurdy>McCurdy, H.W., ed., H.W. McCurdy Marine History of the Pacific Northwest, at 5, 88-89, Superior Publishing, Seattle, WA 1966</ref>

FateHyak was removed from service in 1906.

Notes

Further reading
 Faber, Jim, Steamer's Wake -- Voyaging down the old marine highways of Puget Sound, British Columbia, and the Columbia River, Enetai Press, Seattle, WA 1985 
 Timmen, Fritz, Blow for the Landing'', Caxton Printers, Caldwell, ID 1972 

Paddle steamers of British Columbia
Steamboats of the Columbia River
Columbia Valley
1892 ships